Grassy Creek Township is one of nineteen townships in Ashe County, North Carolina, United States. The township had a population of 455 as of the 2010 census.

Grassy Creek Township occupies  in northeastern Ashe County. The township's northern border is with the state of Virginia, and the eastern border is with Alleghany County. There are no incorporated municipalities within Grassy Creek Township, but there are several unincorporated communities, including the community of Grassy Creek near the North Carolina/Virginia border.

References

Townships in Ashe County, North Carolina
Townships in North Carolina